Martin Vagner (born 16 March 1984) is a Czech ice hockey defenceman currently playing with HC Hradec Králové of the 1. národní hokejová liga. He was drafted in the first round, 26th overall, by the Dallas Stars in the 2002 NHL Entry Draft. He re-entered the draft, however, in 2004 and was selected in the ninth round, 268th overall, by the Carolina Hurricanes.  He has yet to play in the National Hockey League, spending his career to date in the Czech Extraliga.

Career statistics

Regular season and playoffs

International

References

External links

1984 births
Acadie–Bathurst Titan players
BK Havlíčkův Brod players
Carolina Hurricanes draft picks
Czech ice hockey defencemen
Dallas Stars draft picks
Gatineau Olympiques players
HC Chrudim players
HC Dynamo Pardubice players
HC Oceláři Třinec players
HC Olomouc players
HC Slovan Ústečtí Lvi players
HC Vrchlabí players
Hull Olympiques players
Living people
Motor České Budějovice players
National Hockey League first-round draft picks
People from Jaroměř
Sportspeople from the Hradec Králové Region
Stadion Hradec Králové players
Czech expatriate ice hockey players in Canada